Second Beach is the name of several beaches:

Second Beach (Vancouver), in Vancouver
Second Beach (New Zealand), in Dunedin
Sachuset Beach, Rhode Island, often known as Second Beach
Second Beach, in Port Saint Johns
Second Beach (Olympic National Park), La Push, Washington